Charles Emil Peterson (1906–2004) is widely considered to be a seminal figure in professionalizing the practice of historic preservation in the United States. He is referred to as the "founding father" of the professional advocation of historic preservation, the "godfather of preservation," and an "extraordinary preservationist" who made important contributions to the knowledge of early American building practices, helped create the profession of the preservation architect, and passionately advocated for the retention and restoration of the American built heritage. According to Jacques Dalibard, a professor at McGill University School of Architecture, "with James Marston Fitch, I cannot think of two people who had more influence on historic preservation in North America."

During his long career, Peterson received numerous awards for his service including the National Trust for Historic Preservation’s Louise du Pont Crowninshield Award (1966) and the American Institute of Architects (AIA) medal for "vision and determination" (1979) and the Presidential Citation (1990). The AIA inducted him into the College of Fellows in 1962.

Early career
Peterson was raised in Madison, Minnesota, and received his bachelor's degree in architecture in the early 1920s from the University of Minnesota. In 1929, he began a thirty-three year tenure with the National Park Service. In 1931, his efforts were instrumental in saving the Moore House, the site of the British surrender, in Yorktown, Virginia. While documenting this building, Peterson created the prototype for the historic structure report, the basic format of which is still in use.

Peterson is perhaps best remembered for establishing the Historic American Buildings Survey (HABS), a federal documentation program that is still active and which has spawned the Historic American Engineering Record and the Historic American Landscape Survey. On November 13, 1933, while he was the Chief of the Eastern Division for the National Park Service, Peterson wrote a memo to the director which became the charter for the program and successfully garnered funds from the Civil Works Administration the following month. HABS targeted unemployed architects, draftsmen, and photographers to make as complete a record as possible of "the rapidly disappearing examples of early architecture and historic structures throughout the country." This program was credited as "the first major step upon the part of the Federal Government toward the cataloging and preservation of historic structures." The first HABS survey work began in January 1934 and later that year was formalized as a joint agreement with the American Institute of Architects and the Library of Congress. The HABS program has continued nearly unabated to the present.

During his life, Peterson constantly advocated for HABS, and was instrumental in restarting the program in 1957 and later saved it from oblivion when the Reagan administration threatened to pull funding. The end result was a stronger program with greatly increased funding.

Early Philadelphia era
Peterson and NPS historian Roy E. Appelman were assigned to Philadelphia in early 1947 to advise the Philadelphia National Shrines Park Commission on the national park being proposed for the area surrounding Independence Hall. Peterson was the uncredited primary author and editor of the Shrines Commission's 7-volume final report to Congress (December 1947), which was incorporated into the enabling legislation under which Independence National Historical Park was created.

Peterson returned to Philadelphia in the early 1950s to work at INHP. While there, he helped restore Carpenters' Hall and re-create Library Hall, and directed much of the preservation-related activity of the National Park Service in the region. It was in this era that the Commonwealth of Pennsylvania demolished all the 19th- and early 20th-century buildings on the 3 blocks north of Independence Hall, to create an open European-style mall. (Independence Mall remained a state park until 1974.) Peterson oversaw the moving of the Free Quaker Meetinghouse, the only building spared in the creation of the Mall, to accommodate the widening of 5th Street. He opposed the demolition of important 19th-century buildings within INHP, but did not prevail. He retired from the National Park Service in 1962, but continued to live and work from his row house located on Spruce Street. During Peterson's tenure at the National Park Service, he educated numerous students about historic preservation.

In the 1950s, Philadelphia was in decline and the oldest neighborhoods, dating to the 18th century, were being abandoned and left to decay. It was in such a place that Peterson decided to purchase two row homes in 1954, one of which became his home. The area, which is now known as "Society Hill," is today one of the most desirable areas to live in Philadelphia. Peterson not only helped name the area, but his tireless preservation advocacy secured the revitalization of Society Hill by motivating his friends and acquaintances to buy property there.

Career highlights
The 1960s were an extremely productive time for Peterson. He contributed to many scholarly conferences, including the Second International Congress of Architects and Technicians of Historical Monuments in Venice in 1964. It was at this conference that the enormously influential Venice Charter was created, which established much of preservation philosophy that exists to this day and has become ingrained in the National Park Service's Secretary of the Interior's Standards for preservation. Peterson, along with the entire U.S. delegation rejected the charter, however, due to its European focus and the radical emphasis on preservation instead of restoration. In the 1960s, restoration—defined as the "scraping" of later layers of historic fabric in order to restore the appearance of a building to an arbitrary date—was the status quo and represented the majority of preservation work in the United States. The Venice Charter was a radical shift in preservation philosophy that would not become fully accepted in the United States until the 1980s. Peterson also served on the Committee on Principles and Guidelines for Historic Preservation established by the National Trust which helped influence the future direction of the preservation movement.

In the mid-1960s, Peterson was appointed as an adjunct professor to the fledgling historic preservation program at Columbia University where he taught early-American building technology. He worked closely with James Marston Fitch to build this program into the first graduate degree program in historic preservation in the country. Columbia's program became the model which spawned the tens of graduate and undergraduate programs in historic preservation that now exist across the United States. In 1970, Peterson established the European Traveling Summer School for Restorationists that allowed architects to view and participate in restoration projects outside the United States.

Peterson was a founding member of the Association for Preservation Technology International (APT), which was created in 1968 in an effort to provide better education for the restoration, documentation, and preservation of historic buildings. He became the organization's first president in 1969. APT was enormously influential as it represented the first scholarly outlet for the activities of historic preservation. Peterson's activities through APT helped move preservation from an antiquarian hobby to a professional endeavor.

Throughout his career, Peterson was an avid researcher on the history of American building technology. He is best known for his work on Robert Smith, a colonial-era architect which culminated in the publication of his book Robert Smith (1722-1777): Architect, Builder and Patriot by The Athenaeum of Philadelphia and the Carpenters' Company of Philadelphia in 2000. Other topics that Peterson covered included the early architecture of the Mississippi River valley, the use of iron in roofs, the development of the I-beam, and the recovery of the "lost" history of cement and concrete construction.

In 1983, Peterson established the Charles E. Peterson Prize to be awarded to students displaying superior drawing abilities in documenting HABS buildings. Managed by The Athenaeum of Philadelphia, the prize is awarded by HABS, the Athenaeum, and the AIA. He also donated all of his research papers and books to the University of Maryland in 1998, having in 1981 endowed a substantial fund to support scholarly research in American Architecture prior to 1860 at The Athenaeum of Philadelphia and gifted his Archive and Library of Early American Building Technology and Historic Preservation.

Peterson is credited as an architect of Colonial National Historical Park, Jamestown and Yorktown, Virginia, listed on the National Register of Historic Places

Creation of the profession of the preservation architect
According to many contemporary preservation architects, Peterson "almost singlehandedly invented and developed the profession of historical architect." In a similar vein he is considered to be "the father of modern restoration techniques." From his start with the National Park Service in the 1930s, Peterson continually advocated for training of architects in the proper restoration of buildings that respected their history, technology, and authenticity. A continual theme of his was the inadequacy of most architects’ work on historic buildings:
The shortcomings of architects in the field of historical restoration began long ago. It became clear, even in the days of Latrobe, that the most talented designers could not always be trusted around important landmarks. ... Some of our most stylish architects have proposed—and have carried out—gruesome butcheries on historic buildings. ... The architectural profession should police its own ranks, if for no reason than that many laymen have done their homework in history (as a hobby) and are today well ahead of architects.

Peterson explained that there are very few people who understand older buildings and how they are constructed and "as a result, things happen to historic buildings that should not happen to a doghouse."

Architects could not simply learn from books and drawings, but had to experience an old building in all its unrestored, disheveled, shabbiness: "The man who doesn’t get his hands dirty on the job will never know enough." Peterson's work in this regard has helped spawn innumerable training programs for architects, such as that offered by the Heritage Conservation Network, that provide hands-on training on a wide variety of techniques from documentation to pointing with lime mortar.

Legacy
Peterson's legacy can be summed up by his tireless efforts to establish historic preservation as a professional endeavor. He made essential contributions to how old buildings should be documented and architects trained. Every holder of a degree in historic preservation should also credit Peterson for the origins of their education. Lastly, Peterson established a scholarly basis for building interventions. No longer was an antiquarian aesthetic ethic acceptable for historic preservation; all work had to be documented and changes well substantiated with historical records.

Peterson served as the first president of the Association for Preservation Technology International. A 2006 issue of its APT Bulletin featured remembrances by his colleagues.

Notes

Further reading
 Boucher, Jack E. "In Memory of Charles E. Peterson, 1906-2004." APT Bulletin 37, no. 1 (2006): 2.
 "Charles E. Peterson Has Established." College & Research Libraries News 59, no. 7 (1998): 536.
 "Charles E. Peterson, FAIA, Godfather of Historic Preservation." AIArchitect (Aug 27, 2004).
 "Charles E. Peterson, FAPT, FAIA, FSAH (1906-2004)." APT Communiqué 33, no. 3 (2004): 5.
 Committee on Principles and Guidelines for Historic Preservation in the United States. A Report on Principles and Guidelines for Historic Preservation in the United States. Washington, D.C.: National Trust for Historic Preservation, 1964.
 Dalibard, Jacques. "In Memory of Charles E. Peterson, 1906-2004." APT Bulletin 37, no. 1 (2006): 2.
 DeLony, Eric. "In Memory of Charles E. Peterson, 1906-2004." APT Bulletin 37, no. 1 (2006): 3.
 Ferrick, Tom, Jr. "He Gave New Life to What Was Old." The Philadelphia Inquirer, September 8, 2004.
 Gianopolis, Nicholas. "In Memory of Charles E. Peterson, 1906-2004." APT Bulletin 37, no. 1 (2006): 3.
 Gray, Gordon. Historic Preservation Tomorrow. Washington, D.C.: National Trust for Historic Preservation, 1967.
 Greiff, Constance. "In Memory of Charles E. Peterson, 1906-2004." APT Bulletin 37, no. 1 (2006): 3.
 Kapsch, Robert. "In Memory of Charles E. Peterson, 1906-2004." APT Bulletin 37, no. 1 (2006): 3.
 Massey, James C. "In Memory of Charles E. Peterson, 1906-2004." APT Bulletin 37, no. 1 (2006): 4.
 McDonald, Travis. "In Memory of Charles E. Peterson, 1906-2004." APT Bulletin 37, no. 1 (2006): 4.
 Miller, Hugh C. "Preservation Technology Comes of Age in North America: Part I." APT Bulletin 37, no. 1 (2006): 55-59.
 Moss, Roger W. "Charles E. Peterson,"  Athenaeum Profiles: A Not-for-Profit Education New Castle, Del.: Oak Knoll Press, 2014.
 National Park Service. Historic American Buildings Survey. Washington, D.C.: U.S. Government Printing Office, 1936.
 Peterson, Charles E. "Restoration: An Emerging Profession." Building Research 1, no. 5 (1964): 5.
 Peterson, Charles E. "The Role of the Architect in Historical Restorations." In Preservation and Conservation: Principles and Practices; Proceedings of the North American International * Regional Conference Williamsburg, Virginia, and Philadelphia, Pennsylvania, September 10–16, 1972, edited by Sharon Timmons, 1-11. Washington, D.C.: The Preservation Press, 1976.
 Peterson, Charles E. "Charles E. Peterson, FAIA." In Recording Historic Structures, edited by John A Burns, viii-ix. Hoboken, N.J.: John Wiley & Sons, 2004.
 Sims, Ronan Gayle. "Charles E. Peterson, 97, Preservationist." The Philadelphia Inquirer, August 20, 2004.
 Thompson, Maria M. "In Memory of Charles E. Peterson, 1906-2004." APT Bulletin 37, no. 1 (2006): 5.
 Waite, Diana S. "In Memory of Charles E. Peterson, 1906-2004." APT Bulletin 37, no. 1 (2006): 2.
 Waite, John G. "In Memory of Charles E. Peterson, 1906-2004." APT Bulletin 37, no. 1 (2006): 5.

External links 

 Charles E. Peterson papers at the University of Maryland Libraries

1906 births
2004 deaths
University of Minnesota School of Architecture alumni
People from Madison, Minnesota
20th-century American architects
Preservationist architects
Fellows of the American Institute of Architects